Enkel Demi (pen name: Tom Kuka) is an Albanian writer and journalist. He made his literary debut in 2016 with the historical novel Hide mbi kalldrëm (Jujube on Cobblestone). In November 2018, he published his second novel, Gurët e vetmisë (Stones of Loneliness), a family saga which won the national prize for literature in 2019. His next novel was Ora e ligë (Evil Hour, 2019), followed by fourth novel Flama (Calamity), which was published in March 2021. Kuka won the EU Prize for literature for Flama.

References

Albanian writers
Living people
Year of birth missing (living people)